Paul Coffee is a retired American soccer goalkeeper who played professionally in the North American Soccer League and Major Indoor Soccer League.

Coffee played soccer at San Jose State University.  In 1979, he signed as an amateur with the Chicago Sting of the North American Soccer League in order to maintain his Olympic eligibility.  In 1980, he was selected for the U.S. Olympic soccer team, which had qualified for the 1980 Summer Olympics.  He did not compete when President Carter declared that the U.S. would boycott the Olympics, held in Moscow, after the Soviet Union invaded Afghanistan.  Coffee turned professional with the Sting and remained with them until 1981, playing three outdoor and one NASL indoor seasons.  In 1980, he signed with the Philadelphia Fever of the Major Indoor Soccer League before returning to the Sting, now playing in the MISL for the 1982–1983 season.  He finished his career with the Tulsa Roughnecks during the 1983–1984 NASL indoor season.

References

External links
NASL stats

1956 births
Living people
American soccer players
Chicago Sting (MISL) players
Chicago Sting (NASL) players
Major Indoor Soccer League (1978–1992) players
North American Soccer League (1968–1984) indoor players
North American Soccer League (1968–1984) players
Philadelphia Fever (MISL) players
San Jose State Spartans men's soccer players
Tulsa Roughnecks (1978–1984) players
Association football goalkeepers